This list of black animated characters lists fictional characters found on television and in motion pictures. The Black people in this list include African American animated characters and other characters of Sub-Saharan African descent or populations characterized by dark skin color (a definition that also includes certain populations in Oceania, the southern West Asia, and the Siddi of southern South Asia).

The names are organized alphabetically by surname (i.e. last name), or by single name if the character does not have a surname.

In the 1960s

In the 1970s

In the 1980s

In the 1990s

In the 2000s

In the 2010s

In the 2020s

See also
 African characters in comics
 Ethnic stereotypes in comics
 List of black superheroes
 List of black video game characters

Notes

References

Animation characters
 
black